Catherine H. Zuckert (born 1942) is an American political philosopher and Reeves Dreux Professor of Political Science at the University of Notre Dame.

Books
Natural Right and the American Imagination: Political Philosophy in Novel Form
Plato's Philosophers: The Coherence of the Dialogues (University of Chicago Press, 2009)
Machiavelli's Politics (University of Chicago Press, 2017)
The Truth about Leo Strauss (2006) with Michael P. Zuckert, University of Chicago Press
Leo Strauss and the Problem of Political Philosophy (2014) with Michael P. Zuckert, University of Chicago Press

Edited
Understanding the Political Spirit: From Socrates to Nietzsche
Political Philosophy in the 20th Century: Authors and Arguments (Cambridge University Press, 2011) 
Leo Strauss on Political Philosophy (University of Chicago Press, 2018)

References

External links
 Catherine Zuckert

Further reading
Natural Right and Political Philosophy: Essays in Honor of Catherine and Michael Zuckert. Edited by Lee Ward and Ann Ward. South Bend, IN: University of Notre Dame Press, 2013.

21st-century American philosophers
Philosophy academics
University of Notre Dame faculty
Living people
1942 births
Political philosophers
Political science journal editors
University of Chicago alumni
Political scientists who studied under Leo Strauss
Women political scientists
American political scientists